The Columbus Monument is one of three monuments to Christopher Columbus in Baltimore, Maryland. Erected in 1892 in Druid Hill Park, the sculpture is known to be the second oldest monument in Baltimore towards the Italian explorer, the first being the Columbus Obelisk in northeast Baltimore.

History
The Columbus Monument is dedicated towards the Italians of Baltimore as indicated on its inscription.

In June 2020, the group known as the Baltimore BLOC threatened to destroy the monument by offering Mayor Young a dilemma of either removing all Columbus memorials or face vandalism as a consequence. The statue of Christopher Columbus in Little Italy was destroyed by protesters on July 4, 2020, prompting questions surrounding the future of the historic monument.

See also
 
 List of public art in Baltimore
 List of monuments and memorials to Christopher Columbus
 Monument and memorial controversies in the United States

References

Buildings and structures completed in 1892
Buildings and structures in Baltimore
Outdoor sculptures in Maryland
Statues in Maryland
Statues of Christopher Columbus
Sculptures of men in Maryland